John Asare-Antwi (born 28 November 1935) is a Ghanaian sprinter. He competed in the men's 400 metres at the 1960 Summer Olympics.

References

External links
 

1935 births
Living people
Athletes (track and field) at the 1960 Summer Olympics
Ghanaian male sprinters
Olympic athletes of Ghana
Athletes (track and field) at the 1962 British Empire and Commonwealth Games
Commonwealth Games bronze medallists for Ghana
Commonwealth Games medallists in athletics
Medallists at the 1962 British Empire and Commonwealth Games